The codheaded rattail, Bathygadus cottoides, is a rattail of the genus Bathygadus, found in the southeast Atlantic Ocean and the southwest Pacific Oceans, at depths of between 1,000 and 1,600 m.  Its length is between 20 and 30 cm.

References

 
 Tony Ayling & Geoffrey Cox, Collins Guide to the Sea Fishes of New Zealand,  (William Collins Publishers Ltd, Auckland, New Zealand 1982) 
 Iwamoto, T and Anderson, M. Eric. 1994. Review of the grenadiers (Teleostei: Gadiformes) of Southern Africa, with descriptions of four new species. Ichthyological Bulletin J.L.B. Smith Institute of Ichthyology; No. 61. J.L.B. Smith Institute of Ichthyology, Rhodes University, Grahamstown, South Africa. 

Macrouridae
Fish described in 1878
Taxa named by Albert Günther